Marian Iordache Purică (born 5 December 1978) is a Romanian former professional footballer who played as a full-back. He played 10 years for Ceahlăul in 190 matches and scored 16 goals. After that he played mainly at Liga III and in Italy for lower leagues team Rivanazzano Terme.

Honours
Ceahlăul Piatra Neamț
Divizia B: 2005–06

References

1978 births
Living people
People from Buhuși
Romanian footballers
Association football defenders
Liga I players
Liga II players
CSM Ceahlăul Piatra Neamț players
CS Aerostar Bacău players
Romanian expatriate footballers
Romanian expatriate sportspeople in Italy
Expatriate footballers in Italy